Hugh Alexander Forbes Latimer (12 May 1913 – 12 June 2006) was an English actor and toy maker.

He was educated at Oundle and Caius College, Cambridge, where he joined Footlights. He briefly attended the Central School of Speech and Drama, before appearing in White Cargo at the Brixton Theatre in 1936. Noted for his skill in light comedy, Latimer made his West End debut in Pride and Prejudice in 1937.

After being called up in 1940, he was commissioned to the 34th Light AA Regiment and saw active service in the Middle East and India between 1941 and 1945.

He was married to Sheila Gairns. The couple had two daughters.

Filmography

References

External links
 

1913 births
2006 deaths
Alumni of Gonville and Caius College, Cambridge
English male television actors
English male film actors
Royal Artillery officers
British Army personnel of World War II
People from Haslemere
20th-century English male actors